Patrick Richard (born January 25, 1990) is an American-born naturalised Romanian professional basketball player for Cluj of the Romanian Liga Națională. He played collegiately with the McNeese State Cowboys for four seasons before playing professionally in Australia, the Netherlands, Germany, France, Israel, Spain and New Zealand.

College career
Richard played four years for the McNeese State Cowboys. In his senior year, Richard was named the Southland Conference Player of the Year after averaging 17.9 points and 6.4 rebounds per contest. He led the Cowboys to a second consecutive conference tournament final appearance and a national postseason tournament for the second straight year. He completed his career with 1,625 points – 12th best on the McNeese all-time career scoring list. He became just the seventh Cowboy basketball player in school history to earn an all-American honor after he was named an Associated Press All-American honorable mention. He was also named the Louisiana Player of the Year.

Professional career
After going undrafted in the 2012 NBA draft, Richard joined the Detroit Pistons for the 2012 NBA Summer League. On November 2, 2012, he was selected by the Iowa Energy in the seventh round of the 2012 NBA D-League draft. He was waived by Iowa on November 21 prior to playing in a game for them.

In March 2013, Richard signed with the Sandringham Sabres in Australia for the 2013 SEABL season. In 24 games, he averaged 18.5 points, 6.4 rebounds and 2.1 assists per game.

In August 2013, Richard signed with Matrixx Magixx of the Dutch Basketball League. In April 2014, he was named in the All-DBL Team. In 38 games, he averaged 15.3 points, 4.9 rebounds, 2.7 assists and 1.4 steals per game.

In June 2014, Richard signed with Mitteldeutscher BC of the Basketball Bundesliga. In 32 games, he averaged 13.2 points, 3.4 rebounds and 2.8 assists per game.

In June 2015, Richard signed with Champagne Châlons-Reims Basket of the LNB Pro A. In 34 games, he averaged 9.6 points, 2.9 rebounds and 2.1 assists per game.
 
In July 2016, Richard signed with Maccabi Rishon LeZion of the Israeli Basketball Premier League. In 31 league games, he averaged 11.5 points, 4.4 rebounds, 3.0 assists and 1.1 steals per game. He also averaged 12.8 points, 5.8 rebounds, 4.7 assists and 1.3 steals in 16 BCL games.

On July 25, 2017, Richard signed with Joventut Badalona of the Liga ACB. In 32 league games, he averaged 11.3 points, 3.2 rebounds, 1.7 assists and 1.3 steals per game. He also averaged 10.5 points, 4.5 rebounds, 3.0 assists and 1.3 steals in four BCL games.

On June 18, 2018, Richard signed with the New Zealand Breakers for the 2018–19 NBL season. In 26 games, he averaged 11.0 points, 3.5 rebounds and 2.3 assists per game.

On February 21, 2019, Richard signed with Italian team Reggio Emilia.

On July 22, 2019, he has signed with Cluj in the Romanian League.

Personal
In February 2021, Richard received Romanian citizenship, making him eligible to play for the Romania national basketball team. Responding to his new nationality, he stated: "It is a blessing, I am really happy that I was taken into account to receive Romanian citizenship. I feel really good here, as everyone knows. I can't wait to play for the national team."

Awards and accomplishments

Club
U-BT Cluj-Napoca
Liga Națională: (2021)(2022)
Romanian Cup: (2020)(2023)
Romanian Basketball Supercup:(2021)(2022)

Individual
 BBL All-Star: (2015)
 All-DBL Team: (2014)
 DBL All-Star: (2014)
 Southland Player of the Year: (2012)
 2× First-team All-Southland: (2011, 2012)
 Third-team All-Southland: (2010)

References

External links
Patrick Richard at mcneesesports.com
Patrick Richard at basketballleague.nl 
Patrick Richard at lnb.fr 

1990 births
Living people
American expatriate basketball people in Australia
American expatriate basketball people in France
American expatriate basketball people in Germany
American expatriate basketball people in Israel
American expatriate basketball people in the Netherlands
American expatriate basketball people in New Zealand
American expatriate basketball people in Romania
American expatriate basketball people in Spain
American men's basketball players
Basketball players from Louisiana
CS Universitatea Cluj-Napoca (men's basketball) players
Dutch Basketball League players
Joventut Badalona players
Liga ACB players
Maccabi Rishon LeZion basketball players
Matrixx Magixx players
McNeese Cowboys basketball players
Mitteldeutscher BC players
New Zealand Breakers players
Pallacanestro Reggiana players
Reims Champagne Basket players
Sandringham Sabres players
Shooting guards
Small forwards
Sportspeople from Lafayette, Louisiana
Romanian people of African-American descent
Romanian men's basketball players